Lumber City is a former borough in Clearfield County, Pennsylvania, United States. The population was 76 at the 2010 census.

The borough ceased to be a separate municipality on January 6, 2014, and became part of Ferguson Township.

Geography
Lumber City is located southwest of the center of Clearfield County at  (40.932590, -78.580051), on the north side of the West Branch Susquehanna River. It is bordered to the north by Penn Township and to the northeast by Pike Township.

Pennsylvania Route 969 passes through the community following the West Branch, leading northeastward (downstream)  to Curwensville and west (upstream)  to U.S. Route 219 at Bells Landing. Pennsylvania Route 729 crosses the West Branch at Lumber City and leads north  to US 219 at Grampian and south  to Glen Hope.

The upstream end of Curwensville Lake on the West Branch is at Lumber City.

Demographics

As of the census of 2000, there were 86 people, 34 households, and 28 families residing in the borough. The population density was 31.6 people per square mile (12.2/km). There were 40 housing units at an average density of 14.7 per square mile (5.7/km). The racial makeup of the borough was 95.35% White, and 4.65% from two or more races. Hispanic or Latino of any race were 1.16% of the population.

There were 34 households, out of which 35.3% had children under the age of 18 living with them, 70.6% were married couples living together, 5.9% had a female householder with no husband present, and 17.6% were non-families. 14.7% of all households were made up of individuals, and 5.9% had someone living alone who was 65 years of age or older. The average household size was 2.53 and the average family size was 2.79.

In the borough the population was spread out, with 24.4% under the age of 18, 2.3% from 18 to 24, 31.4% from 25 to 44, 33.7% from 45 to 64, and 8.1% who were 65 years of age or older. The median age was 41 years. For every 100 females, there were 104.8 males. For every 100 females age 18 and over, there were 97.0 males.

The median income for a household in the borough was $41,875, and the median income for a family was $47,813. Males had a median income of $31,875 versus $20,000 for females. The per capita income for the borough was $15,655. There were 14.3% of families and 10.2% of the population living below the poverty line, including 13.6% of under eighteens and 38.5% of those over 64.

References

Populated places established in 1835
Former municipalities in Pennsylvania
Unincorporated communities in Clearfield County, Pennsylvania
Unincorporated communities in Pennsylvania
Populated places disestablished in 2014